Lü Jiangang (born 19 February 1979) is a Chinese baseball player who was a member of Team China at the 2008 Summer Olympics. He was the winning pitcher against Chinese Taipei, that was the Chinese Team's only win from the Olympics. He also pitched for China at the 2009 World Baseball Classic. He beat Chinese Taipei again in this tournament.

Sports career
1994 Tianjin Municipal Team;
1998 National Team;
1999-2002 Japan Chunichi Dragons Team;
2003–Present Tianjin Municipal Team

Major performances
2001/2005 National Games - 1st;
2006-2007 National League - 1st;
1998/2002/2006 Asian Games - 4th;
2008 Olympic Games - 8th

References
Profile 2008 Olympics Team China

1979 births
2009 World Baseball Classic players
2013 World Baseball Classic players
Baseball players at the 1998 Asian Games
Baseball players at the 2002 Asian Games
Baseball players at the 2006 Asian Games 
Baseball players at the 2008 Summer Olympics
Baseball players at the 2010 Asian Games
Baseball players from Tianjin
Chinese baseball players
Chinese expatriate baseball players in Japan
Chunichi Dragons players
Living people
Olympic baseball players of China
Tianjin Lions players
Asian Games competitors for China